The Irving Tennis Classic (previously held as Dallas Tennis Classic) is a tennis tournament held annually in Irving, Texas, United States since 2012. The event is one of main tournaments of the ATP Challenger Tour calendar and is played on outdoor hard courts.

History
The Irving Tennis Classic is one of the most prestigious Challenger tournaments since its foundation in 2012, when it replaced the BMW Tennis Championship. Held annually in mid-March, the tournament usually presents a high level in terms of player rankings, similar or even higher than some ATP 250 Series tournaments. This occurs because the tournament is scheduled in-between the Indian Wells Masters and the Miami Open. This way, Top 50 players and below that are eliminated early at Indian Wells come to play in Irving. The first two editions of the tournaments were named Dallas Tennis Classic, but the tournament has been held at the Four Seasons Resort and Club Dallas at Las Colinas since its first edition. As the Resort is actually located in Irving, the tournament was renamed in 2014 to reflect that. The official playing surface of the tournament is SportMaster Sport Surfaces.

Prestigious players that played in Irving include Marin Čilić, Tommy Haas, Jürgen Melzer, and David Goffin.

Past finals

Singles

Doubles

Notes

References

External links
Official website